Meyaadha Maan is the soundtrack album jointly composed by Santhosh Narayanan and Pradeep Kumar for the 2017 film of the same name directed by Rathna Kumar. The album had seven tracks written by Vivek, Pradeep Kumar, Rathna Kumar and Mirchi Vijay. Prior to the album release, three songs – "Thangachi Song", "Enna Naan Seiven" and "Address Song" released as singles on 7, 25 August and 13 September, and the full album was unveiled on 27 September 2017, to positive reviews from critics and audience. Post-release, the tracks "Address Song" and "Thangachi Song" gained popularity.

Production 
As the lead character runs a light music troupe, Kumar allowed the narrative of the film to be musical saying that it was an "integral part in the film". During his scripting process, Rathna Kumar set the film in North Chennai, as he was inspired by the creative talents of people in Royapuram and he met several lyric writers, singers and percussionists during his visits to the areas. Santhosh Narayanan was announced as the film's composer, due to his regular collaboration with Karthik Subbaraj, the producer of this film, and in this process he was keen to allow his long-time collaborator Pradeep Kumar to also work on the film as a co-composer, and played a role in bringing him into the project.

This film marked the debut of Pradeep as a film composer, who initially worked as a playback singer, mostly for films featuring Santhosh Narayanan. Pradeep contributed two songs for the film, while Santhosh had composed five tracks, and also scored the background music for the film. Besides composing, Pradeep had also penned lyrics for one song, with Rathna Kumar penning two songs and Vivek writing four songs for the soundtrack; radio personality Mirchi Vijay (in his first stint as lyricist) penned one song for this film. All songs in the album consisted of varied genres basically set in North Chennai, the album was considered to be a mix of gaana and melodies.

Release 
The "Thangachi Song" is a dance number picturised on Vaibhav and Indhuja Ravichandran who plays the role of the former's sister in the film, which was sung by Anthony Daasan and choreographed by Santhosh. It was released as a single to coincide with the Hindu festival of Raksha Bandhan on 7 August 2017. The song gained popularity among the film audiences, for the catchy tune and quirky lyrics, with The Indian Express stated "the song perfectly captures the naughtiness and love that siblings share". Another single titled "Enna Naan Seiven" sung by Pradeep Kumar and Kalyani Nair released on 25 August 2017, coinciding with Ganesh Chathurthi, which is a melody number. The third single "Address Song" (Adiye S. Madhu) sung by Santhosh Narayanan was released on 13 September 2017. Being one of the typical soup-song genre, Rathna Kumar wanted this song to end the entire genre of bar songs that lambaste women. The album which was marketed by Think Music was released at a promotional launch event held at Loyola College in Chennai on 27 September 2017, with the film's cast and crew and other celebrities in attendance, and also featured a musical performance by Santhosh, Pradeep and his team.

Track listing 
The official track list was released by Think Music India on 23 September 2017 ahead of the music launch.

Reception 
M. Suganth in his review for The Times of India praised the film's cinematography and music (the background score and the songs) adding that "it gave us a taste of North Madras life in the region". In the review for Hindustan Times, Siddharth Srinivas stated that Santhosh and Pradeep "stack up a catchy mix of melodies and kuthu songs for the album", further adding that "the album offers a wondrous mix of variety, dipped in eclectic, exciting tunes that should hit the marquee". The album fetched a positive reception from Behindwoods, saying "Santhosh Narayanan is at his usual best and a fitting debut for Pradeep Kumar as music director" and gave 3 out of 5 to the album. Karthik Srinivasan of Milliblog wrote "The Santhosh-Pradeep combo wins again". A reviewer from Moviecrow stated "Santhosh Narayanan and Pradeep Kumar deliver delectable melodies for Meyaadha Maan" giving a rating of 3.5 out of 5. Avinash Ramachandran of Cinema Express reviewed the album as a "mix of gaana, western music and melodies in good proportions which would be a delight for music lovers". Vipin Nair of Music Aloud gave the album 3.5 out of 5 saying "Santosh Narayanan and Pradeep Kumar deliver a classy set of melodies for Meyaadha Maan" and "it work much better than Santosh Narayanan's quirky tracks".

Charts

Personnel 
Credits adapted from Think Music India

 Santhosh Narayanan – Composer (Track 1,3,4,6,7), arranger (Track 1,3,4,6,7), producer (Track 1,3,4,6,7), backing vocalist (Track 1), piano (Track 4), sound engineer (Future Tense Studios, Chennai) [Track 1,3,4,6,7], audio mixing (Track 1,3,4,6,7)
 Pradeep Kumar – Composer (Track 2,5), arranger (Track 2,5), producer (Track 2,5), backing vocalist (Track 5), acoustic guitar (Track 2,5), bass guitar (Track 5)
 Kalyani Nair – Backing vocalist (Track 1,5)
 Chinna – Chorus (Track 3)
 Britto – Chorus (Track 3,7)
 Yogi Sekar – Chorus (Track 3,7)
 Ramanathan – Chorus (Track 7)
 Vinod – Chorus (Track 7)
 4 Idiots – Percussions (Track 1,3)
 Naveen – Bass (Track 1,3,6)
 Jhanu Chantar – Bass (Track 2), electric guitar (Track 5)
 Tapass Naresh – Drums (Track 2,5)
 Ramamoorthy KT – Piano (Track 3)
 Studio Orchestra of Sydney – Collins Rajendran (Track 4)
 Phil Hartl – Solo violin (Track 4)
 Bharath Shankar – Keys (Track 5)
 Ramkumar Kanagarajan – Percussions (Track 5)
 Fame's Macedonian Symphonic Orchestra (Track 6)
 Oleg Kondratenko – Orchestra conductor (Track 6)
 Andrew T. Mackay – India orchestra co-ordination (Track 6)
 Venkat – Dholak (Track 7)
 Ganapathy – Dholak (Track 7)
 Manikandan Murali – Additional arrangements (Track 7)
 RK Sundar – Sound engineer (Future Tense Studios, Chennai) [Track 1,3,4,6,7], additional rhythms (Track 1,3,7)
 Dinesh Anthony – Sound engineer (Prism Studios, Chennai) [Track 1,3,4,6,7]
 Vishnu Namboodhiri – Sound engineer (Krimson Avenue Studios, Chennai) [Track 2,5]
 Christian Wright – Sound engineer (Studio 301, Sydney) [Track 1,3,4,6,7], audio mastering (Track 1,3,4,6,7)
 Rahul Ramachandran – Audio mixing (Track 2,5)
 Shadab Rayeen – Audio mastering (Track 2)
 Stuart Bruce – Audio mastering (Track 5)
 Meenakshi Santhosh – Music co-ordination

Notes

References 

Tamil film soundtracks
2017 soundtrack albums
2010s film soundtrack albums
Santhosh Narayanan soundtracks